The Aarhus University School of Business and Social Sciences (in short Aarhus BSS) is one of four faculties of Aarhus University in Denmark. The school consists of seven departments: Economics and Business Economics, Management, Political Science, Law, Business Communication, Psychology and Behavioural Sciences and Department of Business Development and Technology (located in the city of Herning). The main campus is located in Aarhus.

Aarhus BSS is a merger from 2007 and teaches programmes at Bachelor's, Master and PhD level along with the MBA (Master of Business Administration), EMBA (Executive MBA) programmes and Summer University and Winter school courses. In 2010 Dale T. Mortensen, a Niels Bohr Visiting Professor at Aarhus University, received the Nobel Prize in Economic Sciences together with his colleagues Peter Diamond and Christopher Pissarides.

History
The history of the Aarhus BSS is both old and new. On 1 January 2007, Aarhus School of Business (ASB or in Danish: Handelshøjskolen) merged with Aarhus University to become part of Aarhus University and in 2011 the Aarhus School of Business and Faculty of Social Sciences at Aarhus University were merged under the name of Aarhus University, School of Business and Social Sciences. Aarhus School of Business  was founded in 1939, and the Faculty of Social Sciences, consisting of several departments and faculties established between 1936 and 1969.

Aarhus School of Business's predecessor, The Jutland Business School (Den Jyske Handelshøjskole, DJH), has a somewhat more extensive history. Already in the late 1800s, DJH provided business programmes to young people from Jutland who wished to follow studies within business, economics and trade. Only when Aarhus School of Business was founded in 1939 did it become the academic institution that it was known as today.

Aarhus School of Business has continually grown since its founding. In 1968 Aarhus School of Business moved from the original location downtown Aarhus to the yellow and red brick buildings which since then have provided the setting for the outstanding research and teaching that Aarhus School of Business stood for.

After the 2011 merger the school now has around 16,000 students, 737 academic staff, including 223 PhD students,[3] making it one of the largest business schools in Europe.

Campus and student life

The campus of the School of Business and Social Sciences has its main base around the University Park, the Nobel Park and campus Fuglesangs Allé, all located in the centre of Aarhus. In 2006, the Institute of Business and Technology in Herning (now AU Herning) was merged with Aarhus University, adding Birk Centerpark in Herning to the campus sites of School of Business and Social Sciences.

Because of its large number of students, Aarhus is regarded as a university town.

The campus in Aarhus and Herning offers a number of facilities, including Aarhus University Sport (AUS) which hosts more than 16 different sports activities and Denmark's biggest Sports Day and Friday Bar, libraries on all campus sites, student organisations like Studenterlauget and the Student Council, and cafeterias and cafes like Dale's café, Aarhus Student House and Klubben.

Accommodation at the university is possible in the University Park Dormitories.

Degree programmes

Bachelor's degree programmes

 Business Administration, BA soc. (taught in Danish)
 Business Administration and Commercial Law (taught in Danish)
 Business Development Engineer (BDE) - in Herning (taught in Danish)
 Economics and Business Administration, BSc
 Economics and Business Administration, BSc - in Herning
 Economics and Business Administration, HA (taught in Danish)
 Economics and Business Administration, HA - in Herning (taught in Danish)
 Economics and Management (taught in Danish)
 Global Management and Manufacturing - in Herning
 Law (taught in Danish)
 Political Science (taught in Danish)
 Psychology (taught in Danish)
 Public Policy (taught in Danish)
 Social Science (taught in Danish)

MSc programmes in economics and business administration 

 Business Intelligence
 Business-to-Business Marketing and Purchasing 
 Commercial and Retail Management
 Finance
 Finance and International Business
 Information Management
 Innovation Management and Business Development
 International Business
 International Business Development - in Herning 
 International Economic Consulting
 Management Accounting and Control
 Marketing
 Operations and Supply Chain Analytics
 Strategic Communication
 Strategy, Organisation and Leadership

Master's degree programmes in other programmes 

 Business Economics and Auditing, MSc (taught in Danish - cand.merc.aud.)
 Business Administration (taught in Danish - cand.soc.) 
 Business Administration and Commercial Law, MSc (taught in Danish - cand.merc.(jur.))
 Economics and Management
 Information Technology - IT, Communication and Organisation, MSc (taught in Danish - cand.it)
 Information Technology - IT, Communication and Organisation, MSc - in Herning (taught in Danish - cand.it)
 Law (taught in Danish)
 MSc in engineering in Technology Based Business Development - in Herning
 Psychology (taught in Danish)
 Political Science
 Political Science (taught in Danish)
 Quantitative Economics
 Social Science (taught in Danish)

MBA programme

School of Business and Social Sciences also teaches a one-year full-time MBA (Master in Business Administration) which integrates both sustainability and personal development into all courses. 25 applicants are admitted to the MBA programme every year.

Executive MBA programme

The school also offers a two-year Executive MBA in Change Management and Leadership aimed at experienced managers. During the programme, managers will go on study trips to Stanford University and a university in Asia.

PhD programmes

Graduate School of Business and Social Sciences offers the following seven PhD programmes:

 Management
 Business Development and Technology
 Economics and Business Economics
 Law
 Political Science 
 Psychology and Behavioural Sciences
 Social Science and Business

All programmes, except Social Science and Business (3-year scheme) are available as 3-year, 4-year, and 5-year schemes.

Rankings

Aarhus BSS is currently (2016) ranked no. 79 in the Financial Times ranking of business schools as well as no. 68 in the Master in Management ranking.
Aarhus University is ranked no. 97 on the Leiden Ranking, no. 86 on National Taiwan University Ranking, no. 65 on Shanghai Academic Ranking of World Universities (ARWU), no. 117 on QS World University Ranking and no. 98 on Times Higher Education World University Ranking.

Accreditations

Aarhus BSS holds the EFMD (European Foundation for Management Development) Equis accreditation, the Association to Advance Collegiate Schools of Business (AACSB) and the Association of MBAs (AMBA). This makes the school one of the few to have the so-called Triple Crown accreditations.

Aarhus BSS is a member of PRME, the UN-funded network consisting of business schools and universities which are all committed to integrating a number of principles for sustainability and social responsibility into their research and educational activities. So far, more than 300 institutions of higher education have joined the network.

Management

Thomas Pallesen is Dean of Aarhus BSS.

The school's Executive Team is formed by the Dean, the Vice-Dean for research and talent development, Per Baltzer Overgaard and the Vice-Dean for education, Peder Østergaard.

Notable alumni

Aarhus BSS has a large network of alumni (former students) gathered in the network of AU Alumni, which aims at creating and maintaining relations between students, staff, faculty and  alumni.

Notable alumni:

 Anders Fogh Rasmussen, (MSc in economics 1978) Prime Minister of Denmark from 2001 until 2009. Secretary General of NATO from August 2009.
 Bjørn Lomborg, (MSc in political science 1991) Danish author, academic and environmentalist.
 Crown Prince Frederik, (MSc in political science 1995) Crown Prince of Denmark.
 Dan Jørgensen, (MSc in political science) Danish politician. Member of the European Parliament since 2004.
 Henrik Poulsen, (MSc in finance) CEO of DONG Energy and former CEO of TDC.
 Jan Beyer Schmidt-Sørensen, (Ph.D. in economics in 1990) director of business development at Aarhus Municipality and former rector of Aarhus School of Business
 Jørgen Vig Knudstorp, (MSc 1995, PhD in 1998 in economics) CEO of the Lego Group
 Lars Rohde, (MSc in economics), from 2013 CEO of the Danish National Bank
 Queen Margrethe II of Denmark since 1972, studied political science in 1961–62.
 Søren Gade, (MSc in economics 1990) Danish politician, Minister of Defence and Member of the Danish Parliament.
 Svend Auken, (MSc in political science 1969) Danish politician. Chairman of the Danish Social Democrats 1987–1992.
 Tøger Seidenfaden, (MSc in political science 1983) Danish journalist. editor-in-chief at Politiken 1993–2011.
 Yildiz Akdogan, (MSc in political science 2006) Danish politician, Member of the Danish Parliament since 2007.

References

External links

Aarhus

Public universities
Business schools in Denmark